Taring Padi is a collective of underground artists in Yogyakarta, Indonesia. The group was formed in 1998 during the general upheaval following the fall of Suharto.

Taring Padi are well known for the production of posters embedded with political and social justice messages, using the cukil (woodcut) technique onto paper or canvas. In addition to their print work, they also create murals, banners, puppetry, sculptures, street theater performances, punk rock and techno music.

History
After the fall of Suharto, Taring Padi occupied an abandoned art school which they used as a residence and workspace for creating art, music and theatre. Following the 2006 Yogyakarta earthquake, Taring Padi moved their base to a studio in Sembungan village, Bantul, Yogyakarta. The group is well known among international art collectors and underground communities such as the Just Seeds Artists Cooperative and has collaborated broadly internationally.

Works by Taring Padi have been shown in many formal and non-formal settings, including the National Gallery of Indonesia in Jakarta and at the 31st Century Museum, Chiang Mai, Thailand. Taring Padi was also included in the group show Sisa: re-use, collaborations and cultural activism from Indonesia at the University of Technology, Sydney gallery.

In 2004 a film about Taring Padi by filmmakers Jamie Nicolai and Charlie Hillsmith,Indonesian Arts, Activism and Rock 'n' Roll, was screened on SBS TV in Australia. A short cut of this film can be seen online. Filmmaker Rohan Langford has made a brief profile of Taring Padi artist Aris Prabawa, who in 2010 held solo shows at the 4A Centre for Contemporary Asian Art and Casula Powerhouse Arts Centre in Sydney.

In May 2010 Taring Padi and networks, together with the victims of Siring Village and surrounds, collaborated to commemorate the 4th anniversary of the Lapindo Mud disaster near Surabaya. They held etching, screenprinting, painting and singing workshop activities culminating with a carnival and a people's stage show on the edge of the dam containing the mud. A film documenting this project can be seen and downloaded at engagemedia.org.

Taring Padi often run workshops at their studio and undertake collaborative projects with communities and national and international art and political groups. In 2010 in Chiang Mai, Thailand (hosted by Empty Space) and 2012 in Yogyakarta, Taring Padi collaborated with Thai and Myanmar artists in the project Under, After and In Between. Under, After and In Between focused on the different circumstances of each country and group and how they can influence the purpose of artistic work. The projects culminated in performances in Chiang Mai, Bangkok, Yogyakarta and Kulon Progo.

Taring Padi published Seni Membongar Tirani (Art Smashing Tyranny) in 2011 in Indonesian and English, which covered 10 years of the collective's work, including art work and academic articles. The book was launched in a number of cities in Indonesia in 2012 and is now available for free download as an e-book.

In 2018 Taring Padi celebrated its 20-year anniversary with a critically-acclaimed retrospective exhibition at the Yogyakarta Institute of Art (ISI).

2022 Documenta controversy 

At documenta fifteen in 2022, Germany's foremost art exhibition, Taring Padi gained notoriety for imagery critics claimed to be anti-Semitic in its mural "People's Justice.", resulting in it being covered up and later removed. The meters high painting was criticized by the state minister of the art Claudia Roth, representatives of Jewish organizations, the Israeli embassy, and others. The painting included a soldier with a pig's face, with the star of David and with the word Mossad on his helmet. Another figure with animal like fangs is depicted wearing a suit and tie, sidelocks and a Bowler hat with SS runes.

Taring Padi denied any discrimination of specific parts of the population. According to them, the painting belongs to a campaign against militarism and the violence experienced during the dictatorship in Indonesia.

See also 
Post-Suharto era
Printmaking

References

Further reading
War Paint, article by Jason Tedjasukmna, Time Magazine
Art for the people, Inside Indonesia
Taring Padi painting session and pictures, journal article by Jaromil
Sembiring, Dalih: Artists Band Together to Offer New Life Choices for Sex Workers, Jakarta Globe May 3, 2009 
Farrell, Margie: Art, Activism and Rock 'n' Roll, 2004, 
Documentary: Indonesia - Art, Activism and Rock 'n Roll. 2002 The House of Red Monkey Producer: Jamie Nicolai. Director: Charlie Hill-Smith. Writer: 	Jamie Nicolai. Charlie Hill-Smith.
 Taring Padi Individual Members Websites - Bayu Widodo, Djuwadi, Muhammad "Ucup" Yusuf

External links
Taring Padi Website

Indonesian artists
Indonesian activists
Contemporary art movements
Political artists